Florbela is a 2012 Portuguese biographical film about Portuguese poet Florbela Espanca, directed by Vicente Alves do Ó.

Cast
Dalila Carmo as Florbela Espanca
Albano Jerónimo
Ivo Canelas

References

External links
 

2012 biographical drama films
2012 films
Portuguese biographical drama films
Biographical films about poets
Films shot in Portugal
Films set in Portugal
Cultural depictions of writers
Cultural depictions of poets
Cultural depictions of Portuguese women
Films set in the 1910s
Films set in the 1920s
Films set in the 1930s
2012 drama films